The 1996 Ju-Jitsu World Championship were the 2nd edition of the Ju-Jitsu World Championships, and were held in Paris, France from November 23 to November 24, 1996.

Schedule 
23.11.1996 – Men's and Women's Fighting System, Women's Duo System – Classic, Mixed Duo System – Classic
24.11.1996 – Men's and Women's Fighting System, Men's Duo System – Classic

European Ju-Jitsu

Fighting System

Men's events

Women's events

Duo System

Duo Classic events

References

External links
Svenska Budoförbundet 1996/97 (MCT, Malmö 1997) – all medal holders, pages 25–24
TOP3 results (not complete)